Jasione laevis is an ornamental plant. It was formerly known as Jasione perennis.

References

W3Tropicos
 

laevis